The 1965 Army Cadets football team represented the United States Military Academy in the 1965 NCAA University Division football season. In their fourth year under head coach Paul Dietzel, the Cadets compiled a 4–5–1 record and were outscored by all opponents by a combined total of 132 to 119.  In the annual Army–Navy Game, the Cadets tied the Midshipmen at a 7 to 7 score. The Cadets lost to Tennessee, Notre Dame, Stanford, Colgate, and Air Force. 
 
No Army players were recognized on the 1965 College Football All-America Team.

Schedule

Roster
 Sonny Stowers

References

Army
Army Black Knights football seasons
Army Cadets football